Aransas County Airport  is in Aransas County five miles (7 km) north of Rockport, Texas. The FAA's National Plan of Integrated Airport Systems for 2009–2013 categorized it as a general aviation facility.

Facilities
It has two asphalt runways: 14/32 is 5,608 by 100 feet (1,709 x 30 m) and 18/36 is 4,498 by 100 feet (1,371 x 30 m).

In the year ending August 1, 2008 the airport had 82,220 aircraft operations, average 225 per day: 60% general aviation, 40% military, and <1% air taxi. 66 aircraft were then based at this airport: 65% single-engine, 17% multi-engine and 18% helicopter.

References

External links 
 Aransas County (RKP) at Texas DOT airport directory
 Aerial image as of January 1995 from USGS The National Map
 
 

Airports in Texas
Buildings and structures in Aransas County, Texas
Texas
County government agencies in Texas
Transportation in Aransas County, Texas